Eilema conisphora is a moth of the subfamily Arctiinae. It was described by George Hampson in 1914. It is found in Ghana.

References

Endemic fauna of Ghana
conisphora
Moths described in 1914
Insects of West Africa
Moths of Africa